The Hockley Mill Farm, also known as Mt. Pleasant Mills and Frank Knauer Mill, is an historic home and grist mill which is located in Warwick Township, Chester County, Pennsylvania.

It was added to the National Register of Historic Places in 1990.

History and architectural features
This farm has three contributing buildings and one contributing structure. They are the miller's house, a one-and-one-half-story, stone-and-frame grist mill, which was erected in 1805, a stone-and-frame bank barn, which was built circa 1840 and the head and tail races. 

The house is a two-and-one-half-story, five-bay, banked, fieldstone dwelling with a gable roof. The foundation in the western section was built sometime around 1725 to support a log dwelling. It was expanded with the present eastern section in 1735; the log section was replaced circa 1780. 

A two-story, two-bay annex was built between 1935 and 1940, and was expanded in 1965. A shed-roofed addition was built to the north in 1990.

It was added to the National Register of Historic Places in 1990.

References

Houses on the National Register of Historic Places in Pennsylvania
Houses completed in 1805
Industrial buildings completed in 1805
Infrastructure completed in 1840
Houses in Chester County, Pennsylvania
Grinding mills in Chester County, Pennsylvania
1805 establishments in Pennsylvania
National Register of Historic Places in Chester County, Pennsylvania
Grinding mills on the National Register of Historic Places in Pennsylvania